France competed at the 1972 Summer Olympics in Munich, West Germany. 227 competitors, 197 men and 30 women, took part in 132 events in 18 sports.

Medalists

Gold
 Daniel Morelon — Cycling, Men's 1000m Sprint (Scratch)
 Serge Maury — Sailing, Men's Finn

Silver
 Guy Drut — Athletics, Men's 110m Hurdles
 Jacques Ladegaillerie — Fencing, Men's Épée Individual
 Michel Carrega — Shooting, Men's Trap Shooting
 Marc Pajot and Yves Pajot — Sailing, Men's Flying Dutchman

Bronze
 Gilles Bertould, Jacques Carette, Francis Kerbiriou, and Roger Vélasquez — Athletics, Men's 4 × 400 m Relay
 Jean-Claude Olry and Jean-Louis Olry — Canoeing, Men's C2 Canadian Slalom Pairs
 Christian Noël — Fencing, Men's Foil Individual
 Gilles Berolatti, Jean-Claude Magnan, Christian Noël, Daniel Revenu, and Bernard Talvard — Fencing, Men's Foil Team
 Jean-Jacques Mounier — Judo, Men's Lightweight (63 kg)
 Jean-Paul Coche — Judo, Men's Middleweight (80 kg)
 Jean-Claude Brondani — Judo, Men's Open Class

Archery

In the first modern archery competition at the Olympics, France entered three men and two women. Their highest placing competitor was Jacques Doyen, at 21st place in the men's competition.

Men's Individual Competition:
 Jacques Doyen – 2369 points (→ 21st place)
 Louis Lemirre – 2266 points (→ 42nd place)
 Alain Convard – 2251 points (→ 44th place)

Women's Individual Competition:
 Herrad Frey – 2230 points (→ 27th place)
 Pierrette Dame – 2196 points (→ 31st place)

Athletics

Men's 100 metres
André Byrame
 First Heat — 10.64s (→ did not advance)

Men's 800 metres
Alain Sans
 Heat — 1:49.2
 Semifinals — 1:49.6 (→ did not advance)
Roqui Sanchez
 Heat — 1:47.9 (→ did not advance)
Francis Gonzales
 Heat — 1:48.8 (→ did not advance)

Men's 1500 metres
Jean-Pierre Dufrasne
 Heat — 3:40.8
 Semifinals — 3:41.6 (→ did not advance)
Jacques Boxberger
 Heat — 3:42.6
 Semifinals — 3:42.4 (→ did not advance)
Robert Leborgne
 Heat — DNS (→ did not advance)

Men's 5,000 metres
Raymond Zembri
 Heat — 14:34.4 (→ did not advance)

Men's 4 × 100 m Relay
Patrick Bourbeillon, Jean-Pierre Gros, Gérard Fenouil, and Bruno Cherrier
 Heat — 39.01s
 Semifinals — 39.00s
 Final — 39.14s (→ 7th place)

Men's High Jump
Bernard Gauthier
 Qualifying Round — 2.15m
 Final — 2.15m (→ 14th place)
Henry Elliott
 Qualifying Round — 2.15m
 Final — 2.10m (→ 15th place)

Men's Pole Vault
François Tracanelli
 Qualifying Round — 5.10m
 Final — 5.10m (→ 8th place)

Boxing

Men's Flyweight (– 51 kg)
 Rabah Kaloufi
 First Round — Lost to Maurice O'Sullivan (GBR), 2:3

Men's Light Middleweight (– 71 kg)
Michel Belliard
 First Round — Bye
 Second Round — Lost to Alan Jenkinson (AUS), 1:4

Canoeing

Cycling

Fifteen cyclists represented France in 1972.

Individual road race
 Régis Ovion — 15th place
 Bernard Bourreau — 39th place
 Marcel Duchemin — 65th place
 Raymond Martin — did not finish (→ no ranking)

Team time trial
 Henri Fin
 Claude Magni
 Jean-Claude Meunier
 Guy Sibille

Sprint
 Daniel Morelon
 Gérard Quintyn

Sprint
 Pierre Trentin
 Final — 1:07.85 (→ 10th place)

Tandem
 Daniel Morelon and Pierre Trentin → 4th place

Individual pursuit
 Michel Zucarelli

Team pursuit
 Bernard Bocquet
 Jacques Bossis
 Michel Zucarelli
 Jean-Jacques Fussien

Diving

Men's 3m Springboard
 Alain Goosen – 322.41 points (→ 22nd place)

Men's 10m Platform
 Jacques de Schouver – 287.04 points (→ 13th place)

Women's 3m Springboard
 Christiane Wiles – 229.56 points (→ 28th place)

Equestrian

Fencing

19 fencers, 15 men and 4 women represented France in 1972.

Men's foil
 Christian Noël
 Daniel Revenu
 Bernard Talvard

Men's team foil
 Jean-Claude Magnan, Daniel Revenu, Christian Noël, Gilles Berolatti, Bernard Talvard

Men's épée
 Jacques La Degaillerie
 Jacques Brodin
 François Jeanne

Men's team épée
 François Jeanne, Jacques Brodin, Pierre Marchand, Jean-Pierre Allemand, Jacques La Degaillerie

Men's sabre
 Régis Bonissent
 Bernard Vallée
 Philippe Bena

Men's team sabre
 Régis Bonissent, Bernard Dumont, Bernard Vallée, Philippe Bena, Serge Panizza

Women's foil
 Marie-Chantal Depetris-Demaille
 Catherine Rousselet-Ceretti
 Brigitte Gapais-Dumont

Women's team foil
 Marie-Chantal Depetris-Demaille, Catherine Rousselet-Ceretti, Claudie Herbster-Josland, Brigitte Gapais-Dumont

Gymnastics

Hockey

Men's Team Competition
Preliminary Round (Group A)
 Lost to Pakistan (0-3)
 Defeated Uganda (3-1)
 Lost to Belgium (0-1)
 Lost to Malaysia (0-1)
 Lost to Spain (2-3)
 Defeated Argentina (1-0)
 Lost to West Germany (0-4)
Classification Match
 11th/12th place: Lost to Poland (4-7) after extra time → 12th place
 Team Roster
 Jean–Paul Sauthier
 Patrick Burtschell
 Pierre Roussel
 Charles Pous
 Christian Honegger
 Marc Remise
 Olivier Moreau
 Georges Grain
 Francis Coutou
 Eric Pitau
 Alain Tetard
 Gilles Capelle
 Marc Chapon
 Georges Corbel
 Jean–Luc Darfeuille
 Yves Langlois

Judo

Modern pentathlon

Three male pentathletes represented France in 1972.

Men's Individual Competition:
 Michel Gueguen – 5072 points (→ 10th place)
 Jean-Pierre Giudicelli – 4807 points (→ 22nd place)
 Raoul Gueguen – 4638 points (→ 30th place)

Men's Team Competition:
 Giudicelli, M.Gueguen, and R.Gueguen – 14559 points (→ 7th place)

Rowing

Men's Coxed Pairs
Jean-Claude Coucardon, Christian Durniak and Alain Lacoste
Heat — 8:09.62
Repechage — 8:15.25 (→ did not advance)

Sailing

Shooting

Thirteen male shooters represented France in 1972.

25 m pistol
 Jean Baumann
 Jean-Richard Germont

50 m pistol
 Gérard Denecheau
 Jean Faggion

50 m rifle, three positions
 Gilbert Emptaz
 Patrice de Mullenheim

50 m rifle, prone
 Michel Fontaine
 André Noël

50 m running target
 Roger Renaux

Trap
 Michel Carrega
 Jean-Jacques Baud

Skeet
 Élie Pénot
 Roger Mangin

Swimming

Men's 100m Freestyle
Michel Rousseau
 Heat — 52.93s
 Semifinals — 52.82s
 Final — 52.90s (→ 7th place)
Gilles Vigne
 Heat — 54.34s (→  did not advance)
Alain Hermitte
 Heat — 54.57s (→  did not advance)

Men's 200m Freestyle
Pierre Caland
 Heat — 2:00.75 (→  did not advance)

Men's 4 × 100 m Freestyle Relay
Gilles Vigne, Alain Mosconi, Alain Hermitte, and Michel Rousseau
 Heat — 3:35.84
 Final — 3:34.13 (→ 7th place)

Men's 4 × 200 m Freestyle Relay
Pierre Caland, Pierre-Yves Copin, Jean-Jacques Moine, and Michel Rousseau
 Heat — 8:00.79 (→  did not advance)

Weightlifting

Wrestling

Water Skiing (demonstration sports)
Men's Slalom:
 Jean-Michel Jamin – 38.0 points (→  Bronze Medal)

Men's Figure Skiing:
 Jean-Yves Parpette – 2740 points (→ 12th place)

Men's Jump:
 Jean-Yves Parpette – 34.75 points (→ 8th place)

Women's Slalom:
 Sylvie Maurial – 28.0 points (→ 4th place)

Women's Figure Skiing:
 Sylvie Maurial – 2560 points (→  Bronze Medal)

Women's Jump:
 Sylvie Maurial – 27.40 points (→  Gold Medal)

References

Nations at the 1972 Summer Olympics
1972 Summer Olympics
Summer Olympics